Ole Anders Olsen (born 15 September 1975), known professionally as Andy LaPlegua, is a Norwegian singer and songwriter, originally known for being founder and lead vocalist of futurepop band Icon of Coil. He also gained fame in the aggrotech and electro-industrial scenes as founder and lead vocalist of Combichrist and Panzer AG.

Biography 
Following the death of Prince, LaPlegua revealed that the biggest musical impact in his life growing up in the early '80s were Bowie, Motörhead, Prince, The Cure, and Dead Kennedys.

Originally a part of several scenes in Norway, LaPlegua experimented with hip-hop in the Detroit Techno/Old School band LAW, industrial in Devils into Crime, punk in My Right Choice/Fleshfire and metal in Lash Out. He also found interest in trance and club music making his mark on the scene with his involvement in the bands Plastic Life and Sector9.

Early on, he was the vocalist in Fredrikstad based hardcore/metal band My Right Choice - who released an EP under the project name Fleshfire, as well as stand-in (and later permanent) vocalist for Lash Out.
Icon of Coil was formed as a solo project in 1997. After becoming very enthusiastic about the music and its possibilities, LaPlegua invited a former bandmate of his, Sebastian Komor to join Icon of Coil to perform live. After several public performances and the release of "Shallow Nation", IoC's first album, Komor joined the band full-time.

Combichrist was officially launched in 2003. It was created as a more aggressive alternative to Icon of Coil. Panzer AG was officially launched in 2004. LaPlegua combined the danceability of Icon of Coil and the hard-hitting beats of Combichrist when he created Panzer AG. His fourth, most techno-oriented project, is (DJ) Scandy. His new project, Scandinavian Cock, is a rockabilly/psychobilly act.

Personal life 
Andy LaPlegua was married to German model and actress Sophia Thomalla in March 2016, and they announced their divorce a year later in May 2017. In December 2018 he was engaged to Liv Blankenship.

Discography

EP 
 One Nation Under Beat (Icon of Coil) Tatra Records 2000
 Shallow Nation (Icon of Coil) Tatra Records 2000
 Serene (Icon of Coil) Tatra Records 2001
 Access and Amplify Tatra Records 2002
 Kiss the Blade (as Combichrist) Out of Line Music 2003
 Android (Icon of Coil) Out of Line 2003
 Blut Royale, 12" vinyl (Combichrist) Bractune Records 2004
 Sex, Drogen und Industrial (as Combichrist) Out of Line Music 2004
 Split (as DJ Scandy) Great Stuff Recordings 2004
 Rock Me / Split / So Do Eye (as Scandy) Maelstrom Records 2005
 So Do Eye (as Scandy) Craft Music 2005
 Get Your Body Beat (as Combichrist) Out of Line Music / Metropolis Records 2006
 Frost EP: Sent to Destroy (as Combichrist) Out of Line Music / Metropolis Records 2008
 Heat EP: All Pain Is Beat (as Combichrist) Out of Line Music / Metropolis Records 2009
 Scarred EP (as Combichrist) Out of Line Music / Metropolis Records 2010
 Never Surrender EP (as Combichrist) Out of Line Music / Metropolis Records 2010
 Uncut EP (as Scandinavian Cock) Metropolis Records 2011
 Throat Full of Glass (as Combichrist) Out of Line Music / Metropolis Records 2011

LP 

 Serenity Is the Devil (as Icon of Coil) Tatra Records / Out of Line Music / Metropolis Records 2000
 The Soul Is in the Software (as Icon of Coil) Tatra Records / Out of Line Music/ Metropolis Records 2002
 The Joy of Gunz (as Combichrist) Out of Line Music 2003
 This is My Battlefield (as Panzer AG) Accession Records / Metropolis Records 2004
 Machines Are Us (as Icon of Coil) Out of Line / Metropolis Records 2004
 UploadedAndRemixed (as Icon of Coil) Out of Line / Metropolis Records 2004
 Everybody Hates You (as Combichrist) Out of Line / Metropolis Records 2005
 Your World Is Burning (as Panzer AG) Accession Records / Metropolis Records 2006
 13 Ways to Masturbate (as Scandy) Masterhit Recordings 2006
 What the Fuck Is Wrong with You People? (as Combichrist) Out of Line / Metropolis Records 2007
 Today We Are All Demons (as Combichrist) Out of Line / Metropolis Records 2009
 Noise Collection Vol. 1 (as Combichrist) Metropolis Records 2010
 Making Monsters (as Combichrist) Out of Line / Metropolis Records 2010
 No Redemption (Official DmC: Devil May Cry Soundtrack) (as Combichrist) 2013
 We Love You (as Combichrist) 2014
 This Is Where Death Begins (as Combichrist) 2016
 One Fire (as Combichrist) 2019

References

External links 
 Combichrist official webpage
 

1975 births
Living people
Norwegian electronic musicians
Norwegian rock singers
Norwegian heavy metal singers
Musicians from Fredrikstad
Combichrist members
21st-century Norwegian singers
21st-century Norwegian male singers